Michael Danan Henry (born 1939) is an American Roshi in the Harada-Yasutani lineage, a Zen sect derived from both the Rinzai and Sōtō traditions of Japanese Zen, practicing in the Diamond Sangha lineage of Robert Baker Aitken. The founding teacher of the Zen Center of Denver, Henry received Dharma transmission from Philip Kapleau Roshi in 1989 and was subsequently recognized as a Diamond Sangha teacher and master by Robert Baker Aitken. Danan Henry Roshi created and implemented the Monastery Without Walls training program; the Lotus in the Flame Lay Order; and the "Every Minute Zen" mindfulness practice as abbot and spiritual director of the Zen Center of Denver.

On September 12, 2010, Danan Roshi conferred Dharma transmission and appointment of abbacy to Karin Kempe, Ken Morgareidge, and Peggy Sheehan, and stepped aside as abbot of the Zen Center of Denver. Danan Roshi has since been serving as the teacher of the Old Bones Sangha, a small group of mostly senior students.

On June 30, 2016, Danan Roshi conferred Dharma transmission to Rafe Martin.

On April 26, 2018, Danan Roshi conferred the status of apprentice teacher to Hoag Holmgren.

See also
Buddhism in the United States
Timeline of Zen Buddhism in the United States

Notes

References

1939 births
Living people
American Zen Buddhists
 American Buddhists
People from Denver
Sanbo Kyodan Buddhists
Zen Buddhist abbots
Rōshi